List of Dominican newspapers may refer to:
List of newspapers in Dominica
List of newspapers in the Dominican Republic